Daniel Rákos (born May 25, 1987) is a Czech professional ice hockey player. He is currently playing with HC Oceláři Třinec of the Czech Extraliga.

Rákos made his Czech Extraliga debut playing with HC Pardubice during the 2007–08 Czech Extraliga season.

Career statistics

References

External links

1987 births
Czech ice hockey forwards
HC Kometa Brno players
HC Chrudim players
HC Dynamo Pardubice players
Stadion Hradec Králové players
Living people
Sportspeople from Pardubice
HC Oceláři Třinec players
Hokej Šumperk 2003 players
Swift Current Broncos players
SK Horácká Slavia Třebíč players
HC Vrchlabí players
Czech expatriate ice hockey players in Canada